The 2011 AFL Tasmania TSL premiership season was an Australian Rules Football competition staged across Tasmania, Australia over eighteen roster rounds and six finals series matches between 2 April and 24 September 2011.

The League is known as the Wrest Point Tasmanian State League under a commercial naming-rights sponsorship agreement with Wrest Point Casino in Hobart and Federal Group. 
On 8 August 2011, AFL Tasmania ruled that official records from the previous TFL Statewide League, TSFL and SWL competitions were now declared null and void in respect to the current TSL and that records would start from 2009 onwards. (1)

Participating Clubs
Burnie Dockers Football Club
Clarence District Football Club
Devonport Football Club
Glenorchy District Football Club
Hobart Football Club
Lauderdale Football Club
Launceston Football Club
North Hobart Football Club
North Launceston Football Club
South Launceston Football Club

2011 TSL Club Coaches
Brent Plant (Burnie)
Brett Geappen (Clarence)
Glen Lutwyche (Devonport)
Byron Howard Jnr & Kim Excell (Glenorchy)
Graham Fox (Hobart)
Darren Winter (Lauderdale)
Anthony Taylor (Launceston)
Clinton Brown & Lance Spaulding (North Hobart)
Jeff Dunne (North Launceston)
Dale Chugg & Mitch Hills (South Launceston)

Current Leading Goalkickers: Tasmanian State League
Brian Finch (Launceston) – 105
Cameron Thurley (Clarence) – 63
Sonny Whiting (Launceston) – 59
Trent Standen (Clarence) – 58
Rohan Baldock (Burnie) – 54

Medal Winners
Tim Bristow (Launceston) – Tassie Medal
Nathan O'Donoghue (Launceston) – Darrel Baldock Medal (Best player in TSL Grand Final)
Anthony Taylor (Launceston) – Cazaly Medal (TSL Premiership coach)
Brian Finch (Launceston) – Hudson Medal (TSL Leading goalkicker)
Tom Arnold (North Hobart) – Eade Medal (TSL Colts)

TSL Colts Grand Final
Launceston 14.12 (96) v Clarence 10.10 (70) – Aurora Stadium

2011 Foxtel Cup
(Saturday, 23 April 2011) -  (Match Report)
Claremont (WAFL) 14.18 (102) v Clarence (TSL) 4.7 (31) – Att: N/A at Bellerive Oval (Night)

2011 Tasmanian State League Ladder

Season Opener (Part Round 3)
(Saturday, 2 April 2011) 
Glenorchy 16.6 (102) d Clarence 9.12 (66) – KGV Oval (Night)

Round 1
(Friday, 8 April & Saturday, 9 April 2011) 
North Launceston 22.14 (146) d South Launceston 9.9 (63) – Aurora Stadium (Friday Night) 
Glenorchy 17.14 (116) d Hobart 10.6 (66) – TCA Ground 
Nth Hobart 15.9 (99) d Lauderdale 10.16 (76) – Lauderdale Oval 
Launceston 30.20 (200) d Devonport 6.4 (40) – Windsor Park 
Clarence 15.13 (103) d Burnie 10.11 (71) – West Park Oval

Round 2
(Saturday, 16 April & Sunday, 17 April 2011) 
Launceston 18.9 (117) v Nth Hobart 16.6 (102) – North Hobart Oval
Clarence 19.14 (128) v Hobart 6.10 (46) – Bellerive Oval
Nth Launceston 20.17 (137) v Devonport 4.8 (32) – Devonport Oval (Night)
Glenorchy 17.19 (121) v Lauderdale 6.11 (47) – KGV Football Park (Night)
Burnie 13.9 (87) v Sth Launceston 11.6 (72) – Youngtown Memorial Ground (Sunday)

Round 3
(Friday, 22 April & Saturday, 23 April 2011) 
Nth Hobart 15.11 (101) v Hobart 13.16 (94) – TCA Ground (Friday)
Launceston 23.15 (153) v Nth Launceston 8.8 (56) – Windsor Park (Friday)
Burnie 19.13 (127) v Devonport 9.6 (60) – West Park Oval (Friday)
Lauderdale 13.12 (90) v Sth Launceston 5.10 (40) – Youngtown Memorial Ground (Saturday)

Round 4
(Saturday, 30 April & Sunday, 1 May 2011) 
Glenorchy 17.10 (112) v Nth Launceston 10.12 (72) – Aurora Stadium
Lauderdale 14.12 (96) v Hobart 13.9 (87) – Lauderdale Sports Ground
Nth Hobart 16.13 (109) v Burnie 7.13 (55) – North Hobart Oval
Launceston 14.14 (98) v Clarence 11.15 (81) – Bellerive Oval (Night)
Devonport 19.14 (128) v Sth Launceston 11.14 (80) – Devonport Oval (Sunday)

Round 5
(Saturday, 7 May & Saturday, 14 May 2011)
Hobart 25.13 (163) v Devonport 11.5 (71) – TCA Ground
Burnie 20.11 (131) v Nth Launceston 12.15 (87) – West Park Oval
Nth Hobart 16.12 (108) v Glenorchy 10.13 (73) – KGV Football Park (Night)
Clarence 8.19 (67) v Lauderdale 7.14 (56) – Bellerive Oval (14 May)
Launceston 28.18 (186) v Sth Launceston 5.6 (36) – Windsor Park (14 May)

Round 6
(Saturday, 21 May & Sunday, 22 May 2011) 
Clarence 20.13 (133) v Nth Hobart 17.14 (116) – North Hobart Oval
Launceston 20.14 (134) v Burnie 12.6 (78) – Windsor Park
Lauderdale 17.17 (119) v Devonport 6.10 (46) – Devonport Oval
Nth Launceston 19.16 (130) v Sth Launceston 8.15 (63) – Aurora Stadium (Night)
Hobart 17.9 (111) v Glenorchy 11.18 (84) – TCA Ground (Sunday)

Round 7
(Saturday, 28 May 2011)
Glenorchy 32.19 (211) v Devonport 4.2 (26) – KGV Football Park
Nth Launceston 17.6 (108) v Nth Hobart 13.16 (94) – Aurora Stadium
Launceston 13.8 (86) v Lauderdale 8.13 (61) – Lauderdale Sports Ground
Clarence 33.19 (217) v Sth Launceston 6.6 (42) – Bellerive Oval
Burnie 20.12 (132) v Hobart 8.9 (57) – West Park Oval

Round 8
(Friday, 3 June & Saturday, 4 June 2011)
Launceston 13.14 (92) v Nth Launceston 8.6 (54) – Aurora Stadium (Friday Night)
Nth Hobart 10.13 (73) v Hobart 10.11 (71) – North Hobart Oval
Lauderdale 16.10 (106) v Glenorchy 11.10 (76) – Lauderdale Sports Ground
Clarence 23.20 (158) v Devonport 5.3 (33) – Devonport Oval
Burnie 25.14 (164) v Sth Launceston 5.4 (34) – Youngtown Memorial Ground

Round 9
(Saturday, 18 June & Sunday, 19 June 2011)
Clarence 15.21 (111) v Glenorchy 10.5 (65) – Bellerive Oval
Nth Launceston 13.13 (91) v Hobart 9.9 (63) – TCA Ground
Burnie 13.11 (89) v Lauderdale 9.3 (57) – West Park Oval
Sth Launceston 14.12 (96) v Devonport 7.9 (51) – Youngtown Memorial Ground (Sunday)
Launceston 21.10 (136) v Nth Hobart 3.6 (24) – Windsor Park (Sunday)

Round 10
(Saturday, 25 June & Sunday, 26 June 2011)
Glenorchy 24.20 (164) v Sth Launceston 11.5 (71) – KGV Football Park
Lauderdale 16.16 (112) v Nth Hobart 11.11 (77) – North Hobart Oval
Launceston 25.18 (168) v Devonport 6.2 (38) – Devonport Oval
Nth Launceston 8.10 (58) v Burnie 7.11 (53) – Aurora Stadium (Sunday)
Clarence 23.19 (157) v Hobart 3.6 (24) – TCA Ground (Sunday)

Round 11
(Saturday, 2 July 2011)
Nth Hobart 15.10 (100) v Glenorchy 11.3 (69) – North Hobart Oval
Clarence 20.21 (141) v Lauderdale 11.9 (75) – Lauderdale Sports Ground
Nth Launceston 17.9 (111) v Devonport 12.3 (75) – Aurora Stadium
Launceston 21.14 (140) v Burnie 9.13 (67) – West Park Oval
Sth Launceston 18.3 (111) v Hobart 11.9 (75) – Youngtown Memorial Ground

Round 12
(Saturday, 9 July & Sunday, 10 July 2011)
Glenorchy 4.11 (35) v Hobart 0.6 (6) – KGV Football Park
Lauderdale 15.19 (109) v Nth Launceston 7.10 (52) – Lauderdale Sports Ground
Clarence 12.14 (86) v Nth Hobart 6.6 (42) – Bellerive Oval
Burnie 17.13 (115) v Devonport 7.5 (47) – Devonport Oval (Sunday)
Launceston 21.11 (137) v Sth Launceston 5.2 (32) – Windsor Park (Sunday)

Round 13
(Saturday, 16 July 2011)
Clarence 18.16 (124) v Nth Launceston 9.10 (64) – Bellerive Oval
Nth Hobart 27.16 (178) v Devonport 7.9 (51) – North Hobart Oval
Lauderdale 9.16 (70) v Hobart 10.9 (69) – TCA Ground
Burnie 24.23 (167) v Sth Launceston 6.8 (44) – West Park Oval *
Launceston 17.22 (124) v Glenorchy 3.5 (23) – Windsor Park
Note: Burnie Dockers wore the original Cooee Football Club uniform to honour its 1961 premiership anniversary. 
Note: South Launceston wore the original City-South red and white playing uniform.

Round 14
(Friday, 22 July. Saturday, 23 July & Sunday, 24 July 2011)
Launceston 13.16 (94) v Nth Launceston 4.6 (30) – Aurora Stadium (Friday Night)
Burnie 19.14 (128) v Hobart 11.3 (69) – TCA Ground
Nth Hobart 21.17 (143) v Sth Launceston 12.7 (79) – Youngtown Memorial Ground
Clarence 19.14 (128) v Devonport 11.7 (73) – Devonport Oval
Lauderdale 18.17 (125) v Glenorchy 5.6 (36) – Lauderdale Sports Ground (Sunday)

Round 15
(Saturday, 30 July & Saturday, 6 August 2011)
Glenorchy 13.17 (95) v Clarence 14.7 (91) – KGV Football Park
Launceston 21.10 (136) v Hobart 10.8 (68) – Windsor Park
Burnie 15.15 (105) v Nth Launceston 6.2 (38) – West Park Oval
Nth Hobart 12.7 (79) v Lauderdale 4.9 (33) – North Hobart Oval (6 August)
Sth Launceston 17.18 (120) v Devonport 11.9 (75) – Youngtown Memorial Ground (6 August)

Round 16
(Friday, 12 August & Saturday, 13 August 2011)
Glenorchy 11.7 (73) v Nth Hobart 9.9 (63) – KGV Football Park (Friday Night)
Clarence 20.15 (135) v Hobart 7.8 (50) – Bellerive Oval
Lauderdale 12.13 (85) v Sth Launceston 5.4 (34) – Lauderdale Sports Ground
Launceston 15.8 (98) v Burnie 6.18 (54) – Aurora Stadium
Nth Launceston 15.20 (110) v Devonport 12.7 (79) – Devonport Oval

Round 17
(Saturday, 20 August & Sunday, 21 August 2011)
Clarence 13.10 (88) v Lauderdale 11.7 (73) – Bellerive Oval
Glenorchy 17.9 (111) v Nth Launceston 12.9 (81) – Aurora Stadium
Burnie 22.20 (152) v Devonport 4.6 (30) – West Park Oval
Launceston 15.10 (100) v Sth Launceston 7.5 (47) – Youngtown Memorial Ground (Sunday) *
Nth Hobart 27.17 (179) v Hobart 10.9 (69) – TCA Ground (Sunday)
Note: Brian Finch (Launceston) kicked his 100th goal during the 4th Quarter.

Round 18
(Friday, 26 August & Saturday, 27 August 2011)
Nth Launceston 18.12 (120) v Sth Launceston 11.9 (75) – Aurora Stadium (Friday Night)
Burnie 11.10 (76) v Glenorchy 5.12 (42) – KGV Football Park
Nth Hobart 13.17 (95) v Clarence 9.22 (76) – North Hobart Oval
Hobart 17.7 (109) v Lauderdale 11.12 (78) – Lauderdale Sports Ground *
Launceston 23.16 (154) v Devonport 2.8 (20) – Devonport Oval
Note: Lauderdale wore their original white and navy hooped Cats strip in honour of their sole 1991 premiership anniversary.

Qualifying Final
(Saturday, 3 September 2011)
Burnie: 6.4 (40) | 10.6 (66) | 14.10 (94) | 20.15 (135)
Clarence: 1.1 (7) | 5.6 (36) | 10.9 (69) | 12.12 (84)
Attendance: N/A at Bellerive Oval

Elimination Final
(Sunday, 4 September 2011)
Glenorchy: 3.2 (20) | 7.7 (49) | 12.13 (85) | 16.17 (113)
Nth Hobart: 3.4 (22) | 5.8 (38) | 6.11 (47) | 9.15 (69)
Attendance: 2,000 (approx) at North Hobart Oval

First Semi Final
(Saturday, 10 September 2011) 
Clarence: 4.3 (27) | 13.5 (83) | 16.8 (104) | 22.14 (146)
Glenorchy: 6.5 (41) | 7.7 (49) | 10.10 (70) | 12.15 (87)
Attendance: N/A at Bellerive Oval

Second Semi Final
(Saturday, 10 September 2011)
Burnie: 3.1 (19) | 9.4 (58) | 13.5 (83) | 14.5 (89)
Launceston: 4.4 (28) | 6.8 (44) | 7.10 (52) | 9.12 (66)
Attendance: N/A at Aurora Stadium

Preliminary Final
(Friday, 16 September 2011) 
Launceston: 6.3 (39) | 8.9 (57) | 11.9 (75) | 13.15 (93) 
Clarence: 1.0 (6) | 3.5 (23) | 8.8 (56) | 8.10 (58)
Attendance: N/A at Aurora Stadium (Friday Night)

Grand Final
(Saturday, 24 September 2011) (ABC1 highlights: 2011 TSL Grand Final)
Launceston: 1.4 (10) | 5.5 (35) | 7.11 (53) | 12.14 (86) 
Burnie: 2.0 (12) | 2.4 (16) | 5.5 (35) | 6.6 (42)
Attendance: 6,658 at Aurora Stadium

References

2011
2011 in Australian rules football